Julio Morales (born 23 May 1957) is a Costa Rican former footballer. He competed in the men's tournament at the 1980 Summer Olympics.

References

External links
 

1957 births
Living people
Costa Rican footballers
Costa Rica international footballers
Olympic footballers of Costa Rica
Footballers at the 1980 Summer Olympics
People from Cartago Province
Association football goalkeepers
C.S. Cartaginés players